Izier is a commune in the Côte-d'Or department in eastern France.

Population

Heraldry 

Technical description of the coat of arms (Blasonnement):  "On a blue background, there are two golden lances arranged to look like Saint Andrew's cross and a golden mallet over everything."

See also
Communes of the Côte-d'Or department

References

Communes of Côte-d'Or